Social Security (Minimum Standards) Convention, 1952 is  an International Labour Organization Convention on social security and protection at the contingencies that include any morbid condition, whatever its cause and pregnancy.[Article 8]

It was established in 1952, with the preamble stating:
Having decided upon the adoption of certain proposals with regard to minimum standards of social security,...

Ratifications
As of December 2022, the convention has been ratified by 65 states.

External links 
Text.
Ratifications.

International Labour Organization conventions
Social security
Treaties concluded in 1952
Treaties entered into force in 1955
Treaties of Albania
Treaties of Argentina
Treaties of Austria
Treaties of Barbados
Treaties of Belgium
Treaties of Bolivia
Treaties of Bosnia and Herzegovina
Treaties of Brazil
Treaties of Bulgaria
Treaties of Chad
Treaties of Croatia
Treaties of Cyprus
Treaties of Costa Rica
Treaties of Czechoslovakia
Treaties of the Czech Republic
Treaties of Zaire
Treaties of Denmark
Treaties of the Dominican Republic
Treaties of Ecuador
Treaties of France
Treaties of West Germany
Treaties of the Kingdom of Greece
Treaties of Honduras
Treaties of Iceland
Treaties of Israel
Treaties of Italy
Treaties of Ireland
Treaties of Japan
Treaties of Jordan
Treaties of the Libyan Arab Republic
Treaties of Luxembourg
Treaties of Mauritania
Treaties of Mexico
Treaties of the Netherlands
Treaties of Montenegro
Treaties of Niger
Treaties of Norway
Treaties of Peru
Treaties of Poland
Treaties of Portugal
Treaties of Russia
Treaties of Romania
Treaties of Saint Vincent and the Grenadines
Treaties of Senegal
Treaties of Serbia and Montenegro
Treaties of Slovakia
Treaties of Slovenia
Treaties of Spain
Treaties of Sweden
Treaties of Switzerland
Treaties of North Macedonia
Treaties of Togo
Treaties of Turkey
Treaties of Ukraine
Treaties of the United Kingdom
Treaties of Uruguay
Treaties of Venezuela
Treaties of Yugoslavia
Treaties extended to the Isle of Man
1952 in labor relations